Nick Kolyohin (born 7 November 1983) is an Israeli-Russian international journalist, correspondent, television reporter, videographer and photojournalist. 

As of 2018, Kolyohin is a correspondent at Xinhua News Agency, based in Israel, and was previously a TV correspondent and deputy Editor-In-Chief of the flagship, evening television news bulletin broadcast at 8 pm in leading Israeli Channel 13 (Israel).

Early life and education

Kolyohin was born in 1983 in Moscow, Russia. In 1992, Nick and his family immigrated to Israel. 

He speaks fluently in English, Russian, and Hebrew. He has appeared in small roles in films, TV series, and commercials since he was a teenager.

Kolyohin served three years in special forces of the Israeli army, where he was trained as a combat soldier and spent his military service as a fighter and counter-terrorism, Krav Maga, and shooting instructor.  After his discharge from mandatory service at Israel Defense Forces in 2006 he continued to serve until 2020 in the reserve forces of the Israeli army.

Career
Kolyohin studied TV, filming, and journalism at Tel Aviv University, after completing his first year he started to work as news editor at Channel 2 (Israeli TV channel), later he worked as a correspondent at various major news outlets in Israel such as One (website) and Hot (Israel), in addition, Kolyohin was a spokesperson at Prime Minister's Office (Israel) in 2011-2012 during the tenure of Benjamin Netanyahu. In 2012 he started his work at Channel 13 News. 

Since 2018 the stories that Kolyohin makes for Xinhua News Agency and CNC World are published in big news outlets around the world. Kolyohin writes features and does on-camera reports mainly about the environment, science, and technology.

See also
Media of Israel

References

External links

 Nick Kolyohin's TV report about the first Chinese university campus in Israel, CGTN (TV channel)
 Nick Kolyohin's profile at IMDb site, IMDb
 Nick Kolyohin's story about the future of smart mobility that published at Sina, Sina Corporation
 Nick Kolyohin's article about Chinese tourists in Israel that was published at PressReader, PressReader
 Nick Kolyohin's publication at The Institute for National Security Studies (INSS), Institute for National Security Studies (Israel)
 Nick Kolyohin's on-camera report about Israel, Hamas continue to trade blows on sixth day of intense fighting at Xinhua News Agency, Xinhua News Agency
 Nick Kolyohin's at Xinhua News Agency on-camera live report on camera during a war escalation between Israel and Gaza strip in 2021, Xinhua News Agency
 Nick Kolyohin's feature titled Israel to Fight Against Environmental Offenders Using Dronesprofile at The Weather Channel, The Weather Channel
 Nick Kolyohin's story about Israeli security agency spies on its citizens amidst COVID-19 to find possible patients, Daily Finland
 Nick Kolyohin story about global cyber threats, The Manila Times
 Nick Kolyohin's story about the rise of Chinese tourism to Israel, China Daily
 Nick Kolyohin's story about cyber industry call for global cooperation to tackle digital threats, News Ghana
 Nick Kolyohin's feature about probiotics unsubstantiated research, Xinhua News Agency
 Nick Kolyohin is interviewed on main Russian TV broadcaster about his exclusive report with a secret camera on international organ harvesting mafia, NTV (Russia)
 Nick Kolyohin's story that published in MSN about Israel aiming to become world leader in use of solar energy, MSN
 Nick Kolyohin's recent stories in Google News, Google News
 Story in Israeli prominent daily newspaper Haaretz about Nick Kolyohin and other famous Israeli journalists that volunteer in independent television news project, Haaretz 
 Nick Kolyohin's verified profile at Muck Rack a global database of journalists, Muck Rack
 Story about Nick Kolyohin being attacked in Greece during vacation, Ynet 
 United States Department of State published that On October 5, 2007, while vacationing in Greece, Nick Kolyohin was beaten in a violent anti-Semitic attack., United States Department of State

1983 births
Israeli television personalities
Israeli journalists
Living people
Russian emigrants to Israel
Israeli Ashkenazi Jews